Herbert Dickson (18 April 1909 – 25 January 1977) was a Scottish amateur footballer who made over 210 appearances as a left back in the Scottish League for Queen's Park. He was described as "of powerful stature and kicks the ball accurately and confidently with either foot. His recovery powers too are first rate".

Career 
Dickson was born in Macclesfield, England to Glaswegian parents who returned to the Cathcart district of their hometown during his childhood. After beginning his career with East Stirlingshire, Dickson played for Scottish League Division One club Queen's Park between 1930 and 1942 and, including wartime competitions, he made 335 appearances and scored four goals for the club. He played in four minor finals with the Spiders – two in the Glasgow Cup and two in the Glasgow Merchants Charity Cup – but finished on the losing team on each occasion. Due to his background, under the rules of the era he was ineligible for selection by the Scotland national amateur football team, which was dominated by Queen's Park players. He was selected for two editions of the Glasgow Football Association's annual challenge match against Sheffield just prior to the outbreak of the Second World War.

References

1909 births
1977 deaths
Anglo-Scots
Association football fullbacks
East Stirlingshire F.C. players
English footballers
Footballers from Cheshire
Footballers from Glasgow
People from Cathcart
Queen's Park F.C. players
Scottish Football League players
Scottish footballers
Sportspeople from Macclesfield